Freemasonry begins in Costa Rica at the same time as in Central America during the course of the 19th century. Regular masonry begins when it was founded by Costa Rican Catholic priest Francisco Calvo, ex-Chaplain General of the Army of Costa Rica during the Filibuster War of 1856, who introduced regular masonry in Central America in 1865. However, there is evidence of the existence of "non-regular" Lodges active after the Independence and before. Prominent Costa Rican figures of politics, literature, art and science, including several presidents of the Republic, were Freemasons.

History
According to historian Rafael Obregón Loría (who was also Grand Master of the Grand Lodge of Costa Rica) several lodges were founded in the country before 1865, and there is evidence of legal proceedings in this regard. A citizen of the surname Bolio (surname that later evolves to Volio) appears judicially indicted for heresy because he was a Mason and who confesses repentance, as well as the name of a Venerable Master in office, a foreigner who traveled throughout Central America, and surnamed Echarri.

Calvo is initiated into regular Freemasonry when making a trip to Peru and returns to the country. The first regular Masonic Lodge of which there is record, was the Respectful Lodge Charity of Costa Rica, established on June 28, 1865 to be recognized by the Grand Administrative Council of the Grand Orient that issues the respective letter patent.

In 1867 the Fraternal Union Lodge was formed, dependent on the Grand Lodge of Columbus in Cuba (regular power also recognized by the Masonic regular power of South Carolina in the US since 1859, and different from the later GOCA in Cuba in 1862 and nationalist and pro-independence in nature), splitting from Charity Lodge for unknown desaveniences, and of which Bruno Carranza would be his venerable master.

On January 9, 1871, the 33rd and last Supreme Council of the Ancient and Accepted Scottish Rite of Central America was founded with headquarters in San Jose, Costa Rica. From Costa Rica, Freemasonry would be promoted to the rest of Central America, linked to the Liberal Revolutions of the 1870s (Costa Rica, Guatemala, El Salvador), and promoting the creation of regular lodges especially Nicaragua and Guatemala.

By 1875 there were lodges in the country Charity No. 1, Hope No. 2, Faith No. 3, Fraternal Union No. 7, Progress No. 9, Wonder No. 12, Sincere Friendship No. 18, Disillution No. 14, Concord and the Future, Regeneration No. 6, Fraternal Union Nº9, La Luz Nº 12, La Libertad Nº 15 and Phoenix. All these lodges join on December 7, 1879 forming the Grand Lodge of Costa Rica. Most lodges in this stage use the Old and Accepted Scottish Rite, only two use the York Rite, and therefore, all they are exclusively male lodges. The requirements to be a Mason at this time were; being over 21 years of age, knowing how to read and write (something quite common since Costa Rica had high levels of literacy) and being a person of good manners. Most Freemasons at the beginning of the 19th century belonged to the bourgeoisie or the small bourgeoisie. Its number of 1865-1899 amounted to 649. Freemasonry spread ideas of humanism, rationalism and the French Enlightenment that quickly became popular among the intellectuals of the time and the ruling classes. In fact the House of Teaching of Santo Tomás, founded by the freemason José María Castro Madriz and whose two first rectors Manuel Argüello Mora (literate, and nephew and foster child of the hero and Benemérito Juan Rafael Mora Porras) and Lorenzo Montúfar (liberal exiled from Guatemala) were also Masters Masons, taught the Chair of Rationalism in the Faculty of Philosophy. During the presidency of Castro would carry out an important general education reform that included public education funded by the State from the primary education for both sexes and with academic freedom.

This promotion of liberal ideas that included the freedom of expression, of conscience and the free debate of ideas promoted during the government of Castro Madriz began to alarm the Catholic Church, which is why the first Bishop of Costa Rica Monsignor Anselmo Llorente y la Fuente is compelled to issue several condemnations to Freemasonry based on the respective papal encyclicals and reaffirms the need of the Church to guide the consciences of the people to avoid Godlessness.

The differences between lodges also seemed to have an impact on the creation of political factions. Thus, while the Charity Lodge emerged the great majority of Castro Madriz's ministers, after the schism that arose in this Lodge and the emergence of Fraternal Union, the opposition to Castro Madriz consisted largely of members of the latter, many of whom supported his overthrowing. During the de facto government of Jesús Jiménez Zamora that toppled Castro Madriz on November 1, 1868, anti-Masonic arguments were used to justify the defenestration, as for example, that was going to destroy the Cathedral and that would ban the catholic religion. Jiménez persecuted freemasonry and during its brief mandate its activities would be prohibited. But as a liberal he did not repelled many of Castro's reforms, for example, the educational reform was maintained and even included in the Constitution.

Jiménez Zamora would be an ephemeral dictator, since he himself would be overthrown about a year after his coming to power and most of the coup leaders who took him from power were Masons. Tomás Guardia takes power and calls a Constituent Assembly that drafts the Constitution of 1871. Among its members were Masons Manuel Aragon, Aniceto Esquivel, Luis Diego Sáenz, Cipriano Muñoz, Andrés Sáenz, Alejandro Alvarado García (members of the Charity Lodge) and Bernardino Alvarado (Pacific Flower Lodge). In general, during the controversial authoritarian government of Guardia there would be countless political struggles between liberal and Masonic factions. Just as in Guatemala there would be different liberal and secular factions, some more militant and anti-clerical (led by the Mason, General Justo Rufino Barrios), and others more civil and democratic (like that of the Mason Lorenzo Montúfar exiled in Costa Rica). After the death of Guardia, his close associate Saturnino Lizano (also a Mason) took over for a couple of months. Próspero Fernández, a liberal soldier, of the Union Fraternal Lodge, obtains the presidency by electoral route and assumes it on August 10, 1882. With his government seems to end the bitter intra-Masonic struggles and gives a decided boost to the liberal and secular ideas and principles. He will continue his liberal work a young rebel student, and then his son-in-law, Bernardo Soto. The controversy over the liberal project is not long in coming, in front of the popular Germany-born Archbishop Monsignor Bernardo Augusto Thiel.

From 1865 to 1870 of 31 deputies, 28 were Masons, 10 judges of the Supreme Court of Justice 9 belonged to Freemasonry, as well as 15 of 16 ministers and 6 presidents of the period were 5.

The number of freemasons in public office is decreasing with time, for the parliamentary period from 1864 to 1866 only 4 of 22 deputies would be Freemasons (18%). Between 1864 and 1900 the number of Freemasons in the Parliament would range between 14% (1866-1868 and 1872-1874) to 34% (1884-1886). These percentages seem to disprove the accusations made by Catholic publications of the time such as Eco Católico where they affirmed that 90% of the deputies were freemasons.

Where they did have much more space was in the Executive Power, from 1865 to 1906 presidents José María Castro Madriz, Bruno Carranza, Tomás Guardia (although he would retire later), José Antonio Pinto Castro, Salvador Lara Zamora, Próspero Fernández Oreamuno, Bernardo Soto Alfaro and Ascensión Esquivel Ibarra were Freemasons. During their governments their cabinets would be made up of a number of freemasons that would range between 58% (Esquivel administration) to 86% (Guardia's). In any case, the situation would change from 1899 with the consecutive conservative governments of José Joaquín Rodríguez Zeledón (1890-1894) and his son-in-law Rafael Yglesias (1894-1902), under whose governments there seemed to be no influence of Freemasonry or important ministers belonging to it.

During the historical period from 1865 to 1899, a series of republican and secularizing political reforms began in Costa Rica that promoted liberal ideas embraced by the social highclass of the time. Many of these liberal reforms that would shape the country were promoted by followers of Costa Rican Freemasonry.

This would cause that for the 20th century Freemasonry would be homologated with liberalism and they would be seen as consubstantial with one another. On this would say the archbishop of San José Monsignor Víctor Manuel Sanabria Martínez:

However, during the nineteenth century relations between the Church and Masonry were always complex. The Costa Rican freemasons can not be identified as anticlerical, in fact there is evidence that Catholic and Protestant priests were part of it and had good relations with the liberal clergy. However, it came into conflict with the local Catholic hierarchy, led by Bishop Bernardo Augusto Thiel, who was an opponent of the liberal government, for which he was expelled from the country (along with the Jesuits) during the administration of Próspero Fernández and his newspaper Eco Católico closed. The expulsion of Thiel caused in turn the temporary separation of Calvo from his position as priest, as Calvo was considered co-conspirator with the government and guilty for the introduction of Freemasonry in Costa Rica, although Calvo himself had been retired from masonic activities for that moment for nine years.

After the death of Fernandez, his son-in-law, Bernardo Soto, nicknamed "Great Protector of the Masonic Order", came to power. Soto through the intercession of Calvo would allow the return of Thiel to the country who seemed to start making peace with Freemasonry. Naturally, under the government of Soto the freemasons would be part of his cabinet in large numbers.

In 1889 arose the conservative Catholic and anti-Masonic Catholic Union Party, which began a fierce anti-Masonic campaign homologoating the organization with Satanism and describing it as an anti-Christian cult. Catholic newspapers of the time also sought to associate Freemasonry with other hostile currents of thought to the Church, thus Eco Catolico associated it with atheism and materialism, while the Catholic leadership linked it with Protestantism and affirmed that both had the same origin and the same goal; the destruction of the Church.

As in other nations, the association of Freemasonry with Judaism could not be absent. According to Ricardo Martinez, in the official newspaper of the Catholic Union Party wrote:

For the 1889 election, the first in which political parties took part, Freemasons Bernardo Soto and Ascensión Esquivel form the historical Liberal Progressive Party that faces the conservative Democratic Constitutional Party that postulates José Joaquín Rodríguez Zeledón who has support from the Church. The progressive liberals are defeated in that process and the Constitutional Party, whose only function was to prevent the triumph of Esquivel, is dissolved. For the subsequent elections of 1894, Rodriguez had already broken his clerical ties and promoted the candidacy of his son-in-law Rafael Yglesias, who was facing the newly founded Catholic Union that nominated José Gregorio Trejos Gutiérrez and faced all kinds of obstacles from the government, including the arrest of your candidate. By this time also the Independent Democratic Party of the freemason Felix Arcadio Montero Monge is founded.

Yglesias and Esquivel founded the National Union Party for the 1902 election, which was dubbed by the Catholic Union as the "Masonic Party" despite the fact that Esquivel had already left Masonry by this time and there is no formal record that Yglesias ever was a Mason.

Costa Rican freemasonry would have an important weight in the founding of the Theosophical Society in Costa Rica in 1904. Several of its founders, such as the writer Roberto Brenes Mesén and the famous painter Tomás Povedano, were also Masters Masons. The Theosophical Society would play a very important influence in the Costa Rican culture in areas such as education, art and politics casually due to the membership of many of its members in important positions of government and the popularization of Theosophy among the Costa Rican aristocracy. This led her to have some cultural clashes with the Catholic Church, especially on certain topics such as artistic representations or complex controversies, such as when Brenes Mesén, director of the Liceo de Heredia, authorized the teaching of evolution and did not allow the teaching of the Catholic religion, two situations that generated angry polemics with the Church.

José Basileo Acuña Zeledón founded in 1919 the first Mixed Masonic Lodge (that is, that admits women and men) called Lodge Saint Germain No 621, originally belonging to Le Droit Humain based in Paris, France, 9 however, since 2002 Most mixed lodges adhere to the Eastern Order of International Co-Freemasonry based in Adhyar India.

Lebanese and Syrian immigration would have an important role in Costa Rican Freemasonry. Many of these immigrants would join masonic lodges and two would become Grand Masters, the first the Lebanese businessman Bejos Yamuni Abdalá who held the post of Venerable Master of the Grand Lodge between 1949 and 1950, and his son.10 Yamuni emigrated along with his parents and brothers arriving in the country in 1901 and prospering as merchants. His family was Maronite Christian and Yamuni, who acquired Costa Rican citizenship in 1912 married Costa Ricna-born of Syrian descent Mercedes Tabush in 1914. Yamuni entered the Freemasonry on July 5, 1905 in the Regeneration Lodge of San Jose, then moved to the Freedom Lodge of San José in 1910, the Hermes Lodge of the same place in 1927 and the Wonder Lodge of Alajuela in 1940 he would build his own Masonic Temple in 1943 under the aegis of Yamuni who was Venerable Master.10 All the previous lodges based on the Scottish Rite. In 1950 Yamuni inresó to the Lodge The Light of Anglo-Saxon Protestants and English-speaking who used the York Rite.10 Both Bejos and his son were part of the Philosophical Chambers, being elected Grand Treasurer, Lieutenant and Grand Master.

References